Hardman is an English surname and given name.

Surname 
Artina Tinsley Hardman (born 1951), American politician
Bill Hardman, American jazz trumpeter
Brian Hardman, New Zealand footballer
Cedrick Hardman, American football player
Chris Hardman, English singer-songwriter
Christine Hardman, Archdeacon of Lewisham & Greenwich
Chambré Hardman, British photographer
Dave Hardman, Pornographic actor
David Hardman, British politician
Derek Hardman, American football player
Donald Hardman, British RAF commander
Edward Hardman, Irish geologist
Frederick Hardman, English journalist and novelist
Harold Hardman, English footballer
Ian Hardman, English rugby league player
Isabel Hardman, English political journalist
John Hardman, English politician and slave trader
Joseph Hardman, English merchant and translator
Lamartine Griffin Hardman, American politician
Leslie Hardman, Rabbi and British Army chaplain 
Mary Juliana Hardman, English nun
Mecole Hardman (born 1998), American football player
Peter Hardman, English racing driver
Richard Hardman, British geologist
Robert Hardman (born 1965), British journalist, author, and filmmaker
Sean Hardman, Australian rugby player
Shirley Hardman, New Zealand sprinter
Tom Hardman, English cricketer
Zoe Hardman, British actress and television presenter

Given name 

 Hardman Earle, English railway magnate and slave trader
 Hardman Lever, English civil servant

Fictional characters 
Cyrus Hardman, a detective and former policeman in Agatha Christie's novel Murder on the Orient Express

English-language surnames